The black oriole (Oriolus hosii) is a species of bird in the family Oriolidae. It is endemic to the island of Borneo. One of the least known of the orioles, its distribution range is restricted to Sarawak in Borneo. Along with the black-and-crimson, maroon, and silver orioles, it belongs to a clade of red and black orioles. The binomial name is after Charles Hose who collected the first specimen of the species on Mount Dulit.

Its natural habitat is subtropical or tropical moist montane forests where it is threatened by habitat loss.

References

black oriole
Birds of East Malaysia
Endemic birds of Borneo
Fauna of the Borneo montane rain forests
black oriole
Taxonomy articles created by Polbot